The Minnesota Rugby Football Union (MNRFU) is the Local Area Union (LAU) for Rugby Union teams in the state of Minnesota. The MNRFU is part of the Midwest Rugby Football Union (MRFU), one of the seven Territorial Area Unions (TAU's) that comprise USA Rugby.

Men's clubs

Division I

Metropolis RFC

Division II
Eastside Banshees Rugby Football Club

Metropolis Killer B's

St. Paul Rugby Football Club

Division IV
Eastside Banshees Rugby Football Club

Faribault Boksprings

Minneapolis Mayhem

St. Cloud Bottom Feeders

St. Paul Rugby Football Club

Rochester Minnesota Rugby

Twin Ports Ice Monkeys

Women's clubs

Division I

Minnesota Valkyries

Twin Cities Amazon Rugby Club

Division II
Minneapolis Menagerie Rugby Club
St. Cloud Sirens Rugby Club

Collegiate clubs

Minnesota Collegiate Rugby consists of teams playing in the Division I-A (Big 10), Great Midwest Rugby Conference, and the Northern Lights Collegiate Rugby Conference - which consists of teams competing in USA Rugby Division 2 and the National Small College Rugby Organization (NSCRO).

Men's collegiate clubs

Division I-A
 University of Minnesota (Big 10)

Great Midwest Rugby Conference
 University of Minnesota Duluth (Division 2)

Northern Lights Conference Tier 1
 Minnesota State University, Mankato (Division 2)
 North Dakota State University (Division 2)
 St. Cloud State University (Division 2)
 University of North Dakota (Division 2)
 Winona State University (Division 2)
 Minnesota State University Moorhead (Division 2)
 St. Cloud State University (Division 2)
 University of St. Thomas (NSCRO)
 St. Johns University (NSCRO)

Northern Lights Conference Tier 2 (NSCRO)
 Bemidji State University
 Carleton College
 Gustavus Adolphus College
 Macalester College
 Southwest Minnesota State University
 St. Olaf College
 University of Minnesota Morris
 The College of St. Scholastica

Women's collegiate clubs

Division I-A
 University of Minnesota (Big 10)

Northern Lights Conference Tier 1
 Winona State University (Division 2)
 Minnesota State University, Mankato (Division 2)
 St. Cloud State University (Division 2)
 North Dakota State University (Division 2)
 University of Minnesota Duluth (Division 2)
 University of North Dakota (Division 2)
 Minnesota State University Moorhead (NSCRO)

Northern Lights Conference Tier 2 (NSCRO)
 College of St. Benedict
 Gustavus Adolphus College
 Bemidji State University
 Carleton College
 St. Olaf College
 Macalester College
 The College of St. Scholastica

References

External links
 Minnesota Rugby Football Union Official Site

 
Rugby union governing bodies in the United States